Micranthes virginiensis, the early saxifrage, or Virginia saxifrage, is a wildflower native to eastern and central North America.

Description

This species flowers in the spring and is usually found growing on rocks, cliffs, or logs. The pubescent stem is thought to deter ground insects, which would be less effective for pollination than flying insects, from reaching its flowers.

Notes

References
 
 

virginiensis
Flora of North America
Flora of Ontario
Plants described in 1803
Flora without expected TNC conservation status